A Town Betrayed is a 2010 Norwegian documentary about the prelude of the Srebrenica massacre (1995), written and directed by journalists Ola Flyum and David Hebditch and produced by Fenris Films, NRK, among others. It was shown on NRK's Brennpunkt on 26 April 2011 and SVT on 28 August 2011.

The film was described by director Ola Flyum in an April 26, 2011 Dagsavisen interview as follows:

The documentary has received criticism from journalist associations, the Norwegian Helsinki Committee, and the foreign minister of Bosnia-Hercegovina. The Norwegian Helsinki Committee filed a complaint with the Norwegian Press Complaints Commission (PFU). NRK and Fenris Film received criticism after the PFU handled the case at a meeting in Lillehammer on October 20, 2011 and found that the film violated point 3.2 of the Ethical Code of Practice for the Norwegian Press regarding citing sources. The PFU concluded that

References

External links

 
 

Documentary films about war
Works about the Bosnian War
Norwegian documentary films
2011 television films
2011 films
2011 in Norwegian television
2011 in Swedish television
Srebrenica massacre
Bosnian genocide denial
Historical revisionism
Historical negationism
Documentary films about the Bosnian genocide
Cultural depictions of Radovan Karadžić
Cultural depictions of Ratko Mladić